Nut Mountain is an unincorporated community in the Rural Municipality of Sasman No. 336, Saskatchewan, Canada. Listed as a designated place by Statistics Canada, the community had a population of 10 in the Canada 2016 Census.

Demographics 

Nut Mountain 
Nut Mountain is a large hill in the east-central region of Saskatchewan. The mountain and several other nearby landmarks  are named after the wild hazel nuts that grow abound in the countryside. The Assiniboine River has its headwaters near the Nut Hills. Ron Petrie, writer for the Regina Leader-Post, was raised near Nut Mountain.

See also 
 List of communities in Saskatchewan

References 

Sasman No. 336, Saskatchewan
Designated places in Saskatchewan
Unincorporated communities in Saskatchewan
Hills of Saskatchewan
Division No. 10, Saskatchewan